Akaska is a town in Walworth County, South Dakota, United States. The population was 77 at the 2020 census.  The community name derives from a Sioux word meaning "uncertain".

Akaska was founded in 1907 as a station stop on a branch line of the Minneapolis and St. Louis Railway built that year between Conde and LeBeau, South Dakota.  Railway service to Akaska ended in 1940.

Geography
Akaska is located at  (45.331844, -100.119717).

Akaska has been assigned the ZIP code 57420, and the FIPS place code 00540.

Demographics

2010 census
As of the census of 2010, there were 42 people, 21 households, and 8 families residing in the town. The racial makeup of the town was 100.0% White.

There were 21 households, of which 19.0% had children under the age of 18 living with them, 38.1% were married couples living together, and 61.9% were non-families. 52.4% of all households were made up of individuals, and 38.1% had someone living alone who was 65 years of age or older. The average household size was 2.00 and the average family size was 3.25.

The median age in the town was 41 years. 23.8% of residents were under the age of 18; 4.8% were between the ages of 18 and 24; 21.4% were from 25 to 44; 19.1% were from 45 to 64; and 31% were 65 years of age or older. The gender makeup of the town was 50.0% male and 50.0% female.

2000 census
As of the census of 2000, there were 31 people, 16 households, and 10 families residing in the town. The population density was 44.1 people per square mile (17.1/km). There were 188 housing units at an average density of 267.4 per square mile (103.7/km). The racial makeup of the town was 90.32% White, and 9.68% Native American.

There were 16 households, out of which 12.5% had children under the age of 18 living with them, 56.3% were married couples living together, 6.3% had a female householder with no husband present, and 37.5% were non-families. 37.5% of all households were made up of individuals, and 6.3% had someone living alone who was 65 years of age or older. The average household size was 1.94 and the average family size was 2.40.

In the town, the population was spread out, with 12.9% under the age of 18, 9.7% from 18 to 24, 6.5% from 25 to 44, 51.6% from 45 to 64, and 19.4% who were 65 years of age or older. The median age was 54 years. For every 100 females, there were 158.3 males. For every 100 females age 18 and over, there were 170.0 males.

The median income for a household in the town was $26,250, and the median income for a family was $26,250. Males had a median income of $22,500 versus $31,250 for females. The per capita income for the town was $13,689. There were 14.3% of families and 15.8% of the population living below the poverty line, including 33.3% of under eighteens and none of those over 64.

References

Towns in South Dakota
Towns in Walworth County, South Dakota